Information filter may refer to 

Information filtering system
Kalman filter#Information filter